Two Spiteful-class destroyers served with the Royal Navy. These ships were both built by Palmers Shipbuilding and Iron Company Limited at Jarrow, and were part of the group of boats known as the 'thirty knotters'.

The boats were not able to make this speed in bad weather, where they were usually wet and uncomfortable with cramped crew quarters. However, they proved their toughness while serving through the Great War, despite being twenty years old. Thanks to their watertight bulkheads, their thin plating and light structure was able to take a great deal of damage and remain afloat; although their plates were easily damaged by rough handling or heavy weather.

Both were originally fired using coal, but in 1904 Spiteful was converted to burn fuel oil. They were armed with the standard 12-pounder gun and two torpedo tubes and carried a complement of 63 officers and men. The two ships of this type bore four funnels and were designated s in 1913. They were sold off after the end of hostilities.

Ships
 , launched 11 January 1899, sold for breaking up 14 September 1920.
 , launched 30 March 1899, sold for breaking up 30 August 1919.

Bibliography

 

Destroyer classes
Ship classes of the Royal Navy